From California with Love is an album by American jazz pianist Andrew Hill, a solo album recorded in 1978 and released on the Artists House label. The album features two of Hill's original compositions.

Reception

The Allmusic review by Scott Yanow awarded the album 3 stars and stated "The creative pianist is heard on two sidelong solo improvisations on this excellent LP, building his solos from fairly simple themes into works of great complexity and individuality".

Track listing
All compositions by Andrew Hill except as indicated
 "From California with Love" - 19:57
 "Reverend DuBop - 18:45    
Recorded at Fantasy Studios, Berkeley, California on October 12, 1978

Personnel
Andrew Hill - piano

References

Artists House albums
Andrew Hill albums
1978 albums
Solo piano jazz albums